Stephen Heller (15 May 1813 – 14 January 1888) was a Hungarian pianist, teacher, and composer whose career spanned the period from Schumann to Bizet. Heller was an influence for later Romantic composers. He outlived his reputation, and was a near-forgotten figure at his death in 1888.

Biography
Heller was born in Pest, Hungary in 1813. He had been destined for a legal career, but instead decided to devote his life to music. At the age of nine he performed Jan Ladislav Dussek's Concerto for Two Pianos with his teacher, F. Brauer, at the Budapest Theater. He played so well that he was sent to study in Vienna, Austria, under Carl Czerny. Unable to afford Czerny's expensive fees, he became a student of Anton Halm. After a success in his first public concert in Vienna at the age of 15, his father undertook a concert tour through Hungary, Poland and Germany.

Heller returned to Budapest by way of Kassel, Frankfurt, Nuremberg, Hamburg, and Augsburg. After passing the winter of 1829 at Hamburg, he was taken ill at Augsburg in the summer of 1830. He abandoned the tour there and was soon afterwards adopted by a wealthy patron of music.

At the age of 25, he travelled to Paris, where he became closely acquainted with Hector Berlioz, Frédéric Chopin, Franz Liszt and other renowned composers of his era. Here Heller achieved distinction both as a concert performer and as a teacher. He taught piano to Isidor Philipp, who later became head of the piano department of the Conservatoire de Paris.

In 1849 Heller performed in England, where in 1850 he was the subject of a long serial article (that is divided between many issues) devoted to his music in the British Musical World. In 1862 he performed Mozart's E-flat concerto for two pianos with Charles Hallé at The Crystal Palace.

He spent the last twenty-five years of his life in Paris.

Works 

Heller was a prolific composer for the piano and his studies remain popular with music teachers and students.

Complete worklist 
 Op. 1 Thème de Paganini varié
 Op. 2 Les charmes de Hambourg. Rondeau brillant
 Op. 3 Fantaisie dramatique sur les opéras Semiramide et Masaniello
 Op. 4 Valse Favorite de Hubovsky. Variations brillantes
 Op. 5 Thème polonais. Variations brillantes
 Op. 6 Zampa. Variations brillantes sur l'opéra de Herold
 Op. 7 Trois Impromptus
 Déclaration
 Adieu
 Amour sans repos
 Op. 8 Scherzo No. 1 (Rondo-Scherzo)
 Op. 9 Sonata No. 1 in D minor
 Op. 10 Trois morceaux brillants
 Divertissement L'elisire d'amore
 Rondoletto Norma
 Rondoletto L'elisire d'amore
 Op. 11 Rondo-Valse
 Op. 12 Rondoletto sur La Cracovienne du ballet The Gipsy
 Op. 13 Les treize. Divertissement brillant sur l'opéra de Halévy
 Op. 14 Passetemps. Six rondinos sur des mélodies de Strauss
 Op. 15 Les treize. Rondo sur l'opéra de Halévy
 Op. 16 24 Etudes. L'Art de phraser
 Op. 17 Le shérif. Six caprices sur une romance de l'opéra de Halévy
 Op. 18 La chanson du pays. Improvisata sur une mélodie de Reber
 Op. 19 La captive. Deux caprices sur une mélodie de Reber
 Op. 20 Hai Luli. Deux impromptus sur une mélodie de Reber
 Op. 21 Bergeronnette. Deux impromptus sur une mélodie de Reber
 Op. 22 La Favorita. 4 rondos sur l'opéra de Donizetti
 Op. 23 Le guitarrero. Quatre rondos sur l'opéra de Halévy
 Op. 24 Scherzo No. 2
 Op. 25 Richard, Cœur de lion. Étude mélodique sur l'opéra de Gretry
 Op. 26 Richard, Cœur de lion. Impromptu sur l'opéra de Gretry
 Op. 27 Caprice brillant in E♭ major
 Op. 28 Caprice symphonique in A major
 Op. 29 La chasse. Étude
 Op. 30 Dix pensées fugitives for Violin and Piano (collaboration with H.W. Ernst)
 Passé
 Souvenir
 Romance
 Lied
 Agitato
 Adieu
 Rêverie
 Caprice
 Inquiétude
 Intermezzo
 Op. 30a ditto, for Piano Solo
 Op. 31 La Juive. Petite fantaisie sur l'opéra de Halévy
 Op. 32 La Juive. Bolero sur un motif de l'opéra de Halévy
 Op. 33 La Truite (Die Forelle) Caprice brillant, mélodie de Schubert
 Op. 34 Le roi des aulnes (Erlkönig) Mélodie de Schubert
 Op. 35 La poste. Improvisata. Mélodie de Schubert
 Op. 36 L'éloge des larmes (Lob der Tränen). Morceau de salon, mélodie de Schubert
 Op. 37 Charles VI. Fantaisie sur l'opéra de Halévy
 Op. 38 Charles VI. Caprice brillant sur l'opéra de Halévy
 Op. 39 La kermesse. Danse Néerlandaise
 Op. 40 Miscellanées
 Rêverie
 La petite mendiante
 Eglogue
 Op. 41 Le déserteur. Caprice sur un motif de l'opéra de Monsigny
 Op. 42 Valse élégante [brillante]
 Op. 43 Valse sentimentale
 Op. 44 Valse villageoise
 Op. 45 25 Études. Introduction à l'art du phrasé
 Op. 46 30 Études mélodiques et progressives
 Op. 47 25 Études pour former au sentiment du rhythme et à l'expression
 Op. 48 No. 1 Charles VI. Chant national de l'opéra de Halévy
 Op. 48 No. 2 Sylvana. Une pastorale
 Op. 49 Quatre arabesques
 Op. 50 Scènes pastorales
 Op. 51 Le désert. Caprice brillant sur l'ode-symphonie de Félicien David [Capricce brillante sur la Marche de la Caravane et la Rêverie du 'Désert' de Félicien David]
 Op. 52 Venitienne
 Op. 53 Tarantella No. 1
 Op. 54 Fantaisie-Stück [Grande Fantaisie auf Lieder von Schubert]
 Op. 55 La fontaine. Caprice brillant, mélodie de Schubert
 Op. 55a Mélodie de Schubert. Transcription of Liebesbotschaft
 Op. 55b Trois mélodies de Schubert
 Op. 56 Sérénade
 Op. 57 Scherzo No. 3 (Scherzo fantastique)
 Op. 58 Rêveries
 Op. 59 Valse brillante
 Op. 60 Canzonetta No. 1
 Op. 61 Tarantella No. 2
 Op. 62 2 Waltzes
 D♭ major
 A♭ major
 Op. 63 Capriccio
 Op. 64 Humoresque (Presto capriccioso)
 Op. 65 Sonata No. 2 in B minor
 Op. 66 La val d'Andorre . Caprice brillant sur l'opéra de Halévy
 Op. 67 On Wings of Song (Auf Flügeln des Gesanges)[La vallée d'amour]. Improvisata sur la mélodie de Mendelssohn
 Op. 68 Stänchen (Hark! Hark! The lark). Caprice brillant, sérénade de Schubert
 Op. 69 Fantaisie-Sonate on Mendelssohn's Volkslied (Es ist bestimmt in Gottes Rath)
 Op. 70 Le Prophète. Caprice brillant sur l'opéra de Meyerbeer
 Op. 71 Aux mânes de Frédéric Chopin. Élégie et Marche
 Op. 72 3 Mélodies de Mendelssohn
 Chant du matin
 Chant du troubadour (Minnelied)
 Chant du dimanche
 Op. 73 [Three Pieces]
 Le chant du chasseur
 L'adieu du soldat
 Berceuse
 Op. 74 No. 1 L'enfant prodigue. Fantaisie sur l'opéra d'Auber
 Op. 74 No. 2 L'enfant prodigue. Valse brillante sur l'opéra d'Auber
 Op. 75 No. 1 La dame de pique. Rondeau-caprice sur l'opéra de Halévy
 Op. 75 No. 2 La dame de pique. Romance variée sur l'opéra de Halévy
 Op. 76 Caprice caractéristique sur des thèmes de l'operette de Mendelssohn Die Heimkehr aus der Fremde
 Op. 77 Saltarello sur un thème de la quatrième symphonie de Mendelssohn
 Op. 78 Promenades d'un solitaire I. 6 morceaux caratéristiques
 Op. 79 Traumbilder. 6 Pieces
 Op. 80 Promenades d'un solitaire II (Wanderstunden) (Rêveries d'artiste). 6 Pieces
 Op. 81 24 Preludes
 Op. 82 Nuits blanches (Restless Nights). 18 morceaux lyriques
 Op. 83 Feuillets d'album. Six morceaux
 Op. 84 Impromptu
 Op. 85 2 Tarantellas (Nos. 3 & 4)
 Op. 86 Dans les bois I (Im Walde). 7 Rêveries
 Op. 87 Tarentella No. 5
 Op. 88 Sonata No. 3 in C major
 Op. 89 Promenades d'un solitaire III (In Wald und Flur). 6 Pieces
 Op. 90 24 nouvelles Études
 Op. 91 3 Nocturnes
 Op. 92 3 Eglogues
 Op. 93 2 Waltzes
 Op. 94 Tableau de genre
 Op. 95 Allegro pastorale
 Op. 96 Grand étude de concert
 Op. 97 12 Ländler et Valses
 Op. 98 Improvisata sur une mélodie de R. Schumann (Flutenreicher Ebro)
 Op. 99 4 Fantaisie-Stücke
 Op. 100 Canzonetta No. 2
 Op. 101 Rêveries du promeneur solitaire
 Op. 102 Morceau de chasse
 Op. 103 Nocturne in G major
 Op. 104 Polonaise in E♭ major
 Op. 105 3 Songs without Words
 Op. 106 3 Bergeries
 Op. 107 4 Ländler
 Op. 108 Scherzo No. 4
 Op. 109 Feuilles d'automne (Herbstblätter) 2 Pieces
 Op. 110 Une grande feuille et une petite (pour un album)
 Op. 111 Morceaux de Ballet
 Pas Noble - Intermède
 Pantomime - Couplets dansés
 Op. 112 Caprice humoristique
 Op. 113 Fantaisie-caprice
 Op. 114 Deux cahiers
 Préludes et Scènes d'enfants
 Presto Scherzoso
 Op. 115 3 Ballades
 Op. 116 2 Études
 Op. 117 3 Preludes
 Op. 118 Variétés. 3 morceaux
 Boutard
 Feuillet d'album
 Air de ballet
 Op. 119 32 Preludes (à Mademoiselle Lili)
 Op. 120 7 Songs without Words
 Op. 121 3 Morceaux
 Ballade
 Conte
 Rêverie du gondolier
 Op. 122 Valses-rêveries
 Op. 123 Feuilles volantes
 Op. 124 Scènes d'Enfants
 Op. 125 24 Nouvelles études d'expression et de rhythme
 Op. 126 3 Overtures
 Pour un drame
 Pour une pastorale
 Pour un opéra comique
 Op. 127 4 Études d'après Der Freischütz de Weber
 Op. 128 Dans les bois II. 7 Pieces
 Op. 129 2 Impromptus
 Op. 130 33 Variations on a theme of Beethoven
 Op. 131 3 Nocturnes (Ständchen)
 Op. 132 2 Polonaises
 Op. 133 21 Variations on a theme of Beethoven
 Op. 134 Petit album. 6 Pieces
 Op. 135 2 Intermèdes de concert
 Op. 136 Dans les bois III. 6 pieces
 Op. 137 2 Tarantellas (Nos. 6 & 7)
 Op. 138 Album dédié à la jeunesse. 25 Pieces in 4 books
 Op. 139 3 Études
 Op. 140 Voyage autour de ma chambre. 5 Pieces
 Op. 141 4 Barcarolles
 Op. 142 Variations on a theme of Schumann
 Op. 143 Sonata No. 4 in B♭ minor
 Op. 144 Caprices sur des thèmes de Mendelssohn
 Op. 145 Waltz
 Op. 146 Sonatina No. 1 in C major
 Op. 147 Sonatina No. 2 in D major
 Op. 148 4 Mazurkas
 Op. 149 Sonatina No. 3 in D minor
 Op. 150 20 Preludes
 Op. 151 2 Études
 Op. 152 6 Waltzes for piano duet
 Op. 152a ditto, for piano solo
 Op. 153 Tablettes d'un solitaire
 Op. 154 21 Études techniques pour préparer à l'exécution des ouvrages de Fr. Chopin
 Op. 155 Fabliau
 Op. 156 Capriccietto
 Op. 157 3 Feuillets d'album
 Op. 158 Mazurka in B major

Works without opus numbers 
 Eglogue in A
 Esquisse in F
 Prière in C
 Romance de l'opéra La chaste Suzanne
 Serenade in A
 Valse allemande
 Transcriptions of 6 Songs by Mendelssohn
 30 Songs by Franz Schubert arranged for Piano
 Lebewohl
 Die Gestirne
 Schlummerlied
 Der Tod und das Mädchen
 Die junge Mutter
 Rosamunde
 Ständchen
 Ave Maria
 Das Zügenglöcklein
 Auf dem Wasser zu singen
 Lob der Tränen
 Die junge Nonne
 Gretchen am Spinnrad
 Die Post
 Erlkönig
 Der Alpenjäger
 Du bist die Ruh
 Im Haine
 Des Mädchens Klage
 Ungeduld
 Morgengruss
 Abschied
 Der Wanderer
 Die Forelle
 Sei mir gegrüsst
 Der Fischer
 Lied des Jägers
 Das Echo
 Drange in die Ferne
 Im Dorfe
 7 Deutsche Lieder, for voice and piano

Songs 
 Album dédié à la jeunesse, Op. 138: No. 9 Morton Estrin, piano. Connoisseur Society CSS 4238
 2 Barcarolles Op. 141 Nos. 1 & 2 Ilona Prunyi, piano. Hungaroton ASIN: B000F6ZIEW
 La chasse. Étude, Op. 29 Catherine Joly, piano. Accord ASIN: B000004CCT
 Dans les bois I, Op. 86 Catherine Joly, piano. Accord ASIN: B000004CCT
 Dans les bois II, Op. 128 Marc Pantillon, piano. Claves ASIN: B000026B99
 Dans les bois III, Op. 136 Marc Pantillon, piano. Claves ASIN: B000026B99
 25 Études, Op. 45 Jan Vermeulen, piano. Brilliant ASIN: B0009IW8TO 
 Étude, Op. 45 No. 16 ("The Mermaid") Allan Schiller, piano. ASV ASIN: B000025QK4
 30 Études, Op. 46 Jan Vermeulen, piano. Brilliant ASIN: B0009IW8TO
 Étude, Op. 46 No. 7 Julianne Markavitch, piano. Starlight Music AZ ASIN: B00006VXOF
 25 Études, Op. 47 Jan Vermeulen, piano. Brilliant ASIN: B0009IW8TO
 -- Sergio Marengoni, piano. Koch-Disco (Koch International) ASIN: B0000251NE
 Étude, Op. 47 No. 2 Morton Estrin, piano. Connoisseur Society CSS 4238
 4 Études d'après Der Freischütz de Weber, Op. 127 Catherine Joly, piano. Accord ASIN: B000004CCT
 2 Impromptus Op. 129 Ilona Prunyi, piano. Hungaroton ASIN: B000F6ZIEW
 2 Intermèdes de concert, Op. 135 Ilona Prunyi, piano. Hungaroton ASIN: B000F6ZIEW
 La Truite (Die Forelle) Caprice brillant, mélodie de Schubert, Op. 33 Elena Margolina, piano. Ars Produktion ASIN: B00007LL51
 Le roi des aulnes (Der Erlkönig) Mélodie de Schubert, Op. 34 Elena Margolina, piano. Ars Produktion ASIN: B00007LL51
 2 Lieder Ulf Bästlein, bass-baritone; Stefan Laux, piano. Audite 97.423
 Mazurka in D♭ Op. 148 No. ? Jean Martin, piano. Arion
 Nocturne in G major, Op. 103 Gerhard Puchelt, piano. Genesis Records GS 1043 [LP]
 3 Nocturnes (Ständchen), Op. 131 Andreas Meyer-Hermann, piano. CPO ASIN: B00000AEOI
 Nuits blanches Op. 82 Jean Martin, piano. Marco Polo ASIN: B0000045Y9
 3 Pieces, Op. 121 Ilona Prunyi, piano. Hungaroton ASIN: B000F6ZIEW
 2 Polonaises Op. 132 Ilona Prunyi, piano. Hungaroton ASIN: B000F6ZIEW
 24 Preludes, Op. 81 Jean Martin, piano. Marco Polo ASIN: B000024OJG
 -- Andreas Meyer-Hermann, piano. Fsm Adagio ASIN: B000003V5V
 Prelude, Op. 81 No. 2 Catherine Joly, piano. Accord ASIN: B000004CCT
 Prelude, Op. 81 No. 15 Stéphane Reymond, piano. Cantando 9208
 32 Preludes (à Mademoiselle Lili) Op. 119 Jean Martin, piano. Marco Polo ASIN: B0000045Y9
 20 Preludes, Op. 150 Jean Martin, piano. Marco Polo ASIN: B000024OJG
 Prelude, Op. 150 No. 16 Catherine Joly, piano. Accord ASIN: B000004CCT
 Prelude, Op. 150 No. 17 Catherine Joly, piano. Accord ASIN: B000004CCT
 Promenades d'un solitaire I, Op. 78 Marc Pantillon, piano. Claves ASIN: B000026B99
 -- Daniel Blumenthal, piano. Etcetera ASIN: B0000000P8
 -- Gerhard Puchelt, piano. Genesis Records GS 1043 [LP]
 Promenades d'un solitaire II, Op. 80 Daniel Blumenthal, piano. Etcetera ASIN: B0000000P8
 Promenades d'un solitaire II, Op. 80 No.? Hans Kann, piano. Preiser ASIN: B00004LMPW
 Promenades d'un solitaire III, Op. 89 Daniel Blumenthal, piano. Etcetera ASIN: B0000000P8
 Rêveries du promeneur solitaire, Op. 101 Marc Pantillon, piano. Claves ASIN: B000026B99
 Sérénade, Op. 56 Ilona Prunyi, piano. Hungaroton ASIN: B000F6ZIEW
 Sonata No. 4 in B♭ minor Op. 143 Sergio Marengoni, piano. Koch-Disco (Koch International) ASIN: B0000251NE
 Sonatina No. 2 in D major, Op. 147 Daniel Blumenthal, piano. Etcetera ASIN: B000025Y9A
 7 Songs without Words Op. 120 Andreas Meyer-Hermann, piano. CPO ASIN: B00000AEOI
 Tarantella No. 1, Op. 53 Gerhard Puchelt, piano. Genesis Records GS 1043 [LP]
 2 Tarantellas (Nos. 3 & 4), Op. 85 Andreas Meyer-Hermann, piano. CPO ASIN: B00000AEOI
 Tarantella No. 4, Op. 85 No.2 Catherine Joly, piano. Accord ASIN: B000004CCT
 -- Julianne Markavitch, piano. Starlight Music AZ ASIN: B00006VXOF
 Traumbilder, Op. 79 Dirk Joeres, piano. Innov. Music Prod. ASIN: B000000TIC
 La Truite (Die Forelle) Caprice brillant, Op. 33 Frank Glazer, piano. Bridge ASIN: B000FO4494
 -- Catherine Joly, piano. Accord ASIN: B000004CCT
 Valses-rêveries, Op. 122 Gerhard Puchelt, piano. Genesis Records GS 1043 [LP]
 33 Variations on a theme of Beethoven, Op. 130 Catherine Joly, piano. Accord ASIN: B000004CCT
 -- Andreas Meyer-Hermann, piano. Fsm Adagio ASIN: B000003V5V
 -- Gerhard Puchelt, piano. Genesis Records GS 1043 [LP]
 Variations on a theme of Schumann Op. 142 Andreas Meyer-Hermann, piano. CPO ASIN: B00000AEOI
 Voyage autour de ma chambre, Op. 140 Andreas Meyer-Hermann, piano. CPO ASIN: B00000AEOI
 -- Stéphane Reymond, piano. Cantando 9208
 Voyage autour de ma chambre, Op. 140 No. 2 Clemens Kröger, piano. Thorofon (Bella Musica) ASIN: B0000279WB
 Voyage autour de ma chambre, Op. 140 No. 5 Clemens Kröger, piano. Thorofon (Bella Musica) ASIN: B0000279WB
 Waltz, Op. 93 No. 1 Clemens Kröger, piano. Thorofon (Bella Musica) ASIN: B0000279WB

Notes

Further reading 
 
 ditto. Detroit: Detroit Reprints in Music, 1974. 
 Kersten, Ursula, ed. Stephen Heller, Briefe an Robert Schumann. Frankfurt am Main: Peter Lang, 1988 .
 Müller-Kersten, Ursula, Stephen Heller, ein Klaviermeister der Romantik: biographische und stilkritische Studien. Frankfurt am Main, New York: P. Lang, c1986. 
 Schütz, Rudolf. Stephen Heller; ein Künstlerleben. Leipzig: Breitkopf & Härtel, 1911.

 Grove's Dictionary of Music and Musicians, New York: Grove, 2001. .
 François-Joseph Fétis, Biographie universelle des musiciens et bibliographie générale de la musique. Paris: Firmin-Didot, 1878-1884.
 Theodore Baker, A Biographical Dictionary of Musicians, New York: G. Schirmer, 1900.

External links 

 Jewish Encyclopedia
 
 

 

1813 births
1888 deaths
19th-century classical composers
19th-century classical pianists
19th-century Hungarian people
19th-century male musicians
Burials at Père Lachaise Cemetery
Honorary Members of the Royal Philharmonic Society
Hungarian classical composers
Hungarian classical pianists
Hungarian expatriates in Austria
Hungarian expatriates in France
Hungarian expatriates in Germany
Hungarian male classical composers
Hungarian Romantic composers
Male classical pianists
People from Pest, Hungary